Ameet K. Ghasi (born 1987) is an English chess player who received the FIDE title of International Master (IM) in September 2012.

In 2000, at the age of 13, Ghasi shared the British Rapidplay Chess Championship title with Aaron Summerscale becoming the youngest ever winner. He was once considered one of the brightest prospects on the chess circuit, but Ghasi put his chess career on hold to further his academic studies. His twin brother, Sumeet Ghasi, is also a strong player, rated around 2200 FIDE.

Ghasi completed his Biochemistry degree at The University of Birmingham and currently works for the National Audit Office as a trainee accountant, hoping to gain his ACA qualification during 2012.

In August 2011, he decided, after many years of absence, to return to the game to seek the title of Grandmaster and during a competition in Sunningdale, took one step closer to gaining the International Master title by winning eight games in a row.

In March 2012, Ghasi won the 2012 British Blitz Championship with 9/11 beating Robert Wilmoth in the final round.

Ghasi has now completed his ACA qualification and is working for Deloitte LLP within the Audit Advisory department as an assistant manager.

References

External links
 
 
 
 

1987 births
Living people
English chess players
Chess International Masters
People educated at King Edward's School, Birmingham